The 2020 New Jersey Democratic presidential primary took place on Tuesday, July 7, 2020, as part of the Democratic Party presidential primaries for the 2020 presidential election. The New Jersey primary is a semi-closed primary, with the state awarding 147 delegates, of which 126 are pledged delegates allocated on the basis of the results of the primary.

Procedure
New Jersey planned to originally hold its primary elections on June 2, 2020, the same day as that of Montana, New Mexico, South Dakota and the District of Columbia. New Jersey is traditionally one of the last states to vote, although later on, many states had already moved their elections to June due to the COVID-19 pandemic in the United States. New Jersey Governor Phil Murphy announced on April 8, 2020, that, because of the COVID-19 pandemic, the primary would be postponed until July 7.

Voting is expected to take place throughout the state from 6:00 a.m. until 8:00 p.m. In the semi-closed primary, candidates must meet a threshold of 15 percent at the delegate district or statewide level in order to be considered viable. The 126 pledged delegates to the 2020 Democratic National Convention will be allocated proportionally on the basis of the results of the primary. Of the 126 pledged delegates, between 3 and 4 are allocated to each of the state's 20 "delegate districts", each consisting of two legislative districts, and another 14 are allocated to party leaders and elected officials (PLEO delegates), in addition to 23 at-large pledged delegates. These delegate totals do not account for pledged delegate bonuses or penalties from timing or clustering.

District-level delegates are chosen in the presidential primary with delegate candidates appearing on the ballot. Should presidential candidates be entitled to more district delegates than delegate candidates presented, a special post-primary caucus at the state convention will be called on Wednesday, June 10, 2020, to designate the additional delegates. The Democratic state committee will subsequently convene at the state convention on Saturday, June 13, 2020, to vote on the 23 pledged at-large and 14 PLEO delegates to send to the Democratic National Convention. The 126 pledged delegates New Jersey sends to the national convention will be joined by 21 unpledged PLEO delegates (7 members of the Democratic National Committee; 13 members of Congress, including both Senators and 11 U.S. Representatives; and the governor).

On May 15, 2020, the governor signed an executive order declaring that the primary election will become a primarily vote-by-mail election. Democratic and Republican voters will automatically receive a vote-by-mail ballot while unaffiliated and inactive voters will get a vote-by-mail application. Unaffiliated voters must declare their party in the application and send it in to their respective county board of elections in order to vote and receive their primary election ballot. A limited number of polling stations in each county will be available on primary day for those who prefer to vote in person (including with provisional ballots if they're unable to obtain one) and for voters with disabilities.

Polling

Results

Results by county
Biden won every county in New Jersey. As was the case in the 2016 primary, Sanders performed best in the northwestern part of the state.

Notes

References

External links
The Green Papers delegate allocation summary
New Jersey Democratic State Committee draft delegate selection plan 

New Jersey Democratic
Democratic primary
2020
New Jersey